Coffee Mornings is the second play by BAFTA winner Stuart Brennan. It premiered at the Stoke Repertory Theatre on 16 August 2012. The play was directed by Peter Snee.

Original cast 
Two female leads and one supporting male:

 Jane - Kaye Quinley
 Sarah - Taryn Kay
 Postman - Ian Curran

References 

British plays
2012 plays